Maya is the third studio album by Bosnian pop star Maya Berović. It was released under BN Music on 17 February 2011.

Background
Two months after the release of her second studio album Crno zlato (2008), Maya debuted a self-released non-album single "Koliko te ludo volim ja" (Madly in Love with You) in February 2009. Soon after, she began work on her third studio album under the Bosnian record label BN Music, based in Bijeljina.

Singles
Her big professional breakthrough came upon the release of her third and eponymous album and the success of the lead single, the feminist ballad "Djevojačko prezime", released 8 February 2011. The plot of the music video has a 'violence against women' theme and Maya wore makeup to mimic a black eye, suffered at the hands of her fictional alcoholic boyfriend. The video was directed by Bosnian-Swiss director Haris Dubica and premiered on 13 May 2011. It was filmed in Lucerne, Switzerland and featured French, Swiss, Croatian and Australian actors. In December 2011, the song won multiple regional awards and was the recipient of the "Hit of the Year" award in Sarajevo.

The albums other singles were upbeat pop-folk songs which were perceived well by critics and her fans.

Track listing

Personnel

Instruments

Dejan Kostić – backing vocals
Slavko Stefanović – backing vocals, keyboards
Ivana Selakov – backing vocals
Pera Stokanović – backing vocals
Snežana Aga – backing vocals
D.K. Struja – accordion (1, 3, 4, 8, 11), keyboards
S. Stefanović Slavkoni – accordion (6, 10)
Petar Trumbetaš – acoustic guitar, electric guitar
Dragan Trnavac Trne – bass guitar (5, 6, 10)
Joca Stefanović – keyboards
Đorđe Janković – keyboards
Žikica Jovanović Sremac – violin

Production and recording

D.K. Struja – arranging, producing, programming (1, 2, 3, 4, 7, 8, 9, 11)
S. Stefanović Slavkoni – arrangement, production, programming, engineering (post-production) (6, 10)
Đorđe Janković – mixing (1, 2, 3, 4, 7, 8, 9, 11)
Joca Stefanović – programming (6, 10)

Crew

Biljana Živadinović – hair
Tijana Todorović – styling
Srđan Petković – makeup
Andreja Damnjanović – photography

References

2011 albums
Maya Berović albums
BN Music albums